Lani Desmonet Lydic (born June 30, 1981) is an American comedian and actress who is a correspondent on The Daily Show. From 2011 to 2016, she starred as guidance counselor Valerie Marks on the MTV comedy-drama series Awkward. She got her start in the 2001 parody film Not Another Teen Movie. She also starred in the Spike miniseries Invasion Iowa alongside William Shatner, and the parody series The Real Wedding Crashers. She appeared as Shea Seger in the 2011 film We Bought a Zoo alongside Matt Damon and Scarlett Johansson, and in the 2013 film The Babymakers with Olivia Munn. Lydic also appeared as one half of a lesbian couple on an episode of the Disney Channel series Good Luck Charlie in 2014. She joined Trevor Noah's lineup of correspondents for The Daily Show on September 29, 2015.

Early life
Lydic was born in Louisville, Kentucky. At age of 3, Lydic became enamored of comedic acting from watching Carol Burnett play Miss Agatha Hannigan in  Annie. As a child, she enrolled in the Young Actors Institute at the Youth Performing Arts School and starred in a Kroger commercial. She later moved to Los Angeles and became an improvisational actor, performing at The Groundlings and Improv Olympic.

Career
On The Daily Show with Trevor Noah Desi Lydic saw herself as a comedic actor with "a journalistic responsibility" to the truth, in regards to the serious topics she approaches through a humorous lens, as a correspondent for the show. Lydic created her first one-hour special which aired on May 13, 2019 on Comedy Central, and was entitled "The Daily Show with Trevor Noah Presents Desi Lydic: Abroad". The special explores how the United States is now further apart in gender equality than many other countries in the world. The special was nominated for a Writers Guild Award. After the passing of US Supreme Court  Justice Ruth Bader Ginsburg, Desi Lydic paid tribute to her work, and life in a half-hour special entitled "The Daily Show with Trevor Noah Presents: Remembering RBG – A Nation Ugly Cries with Desi Lydic" aired on Comedy Central on October 30, 2020.

Personal life
Lydic has one son with her husband Gannon Brousseau named Brixton, who was born in late December 2015. While filming her Comedy Central special "Abroad" Lydic was "gifted" a "small upside-down triangle tattoo representing female empowerment" as a commemoration of her time spent with Icelandic all-female rap collective Daughters of Reykjavík. The tattoo marked her as the 23rd member of the group.

Filmography

References

External links

 
 

Living people
People from Summit, New Jersey
American women comedians
American television actresses
21st-century American actresses
1981 births
Actresses from New Jersey
Actresses from Louisville, Kentucky
American film actresses
21st-century American comedians
Comedians from Kentucky